Inquisitor komiticus is an extinct species of sea snail, a marine gastropod mollusk in the family Pseudomelatomidae, the turrids and allies.

Description
The length (estimated) attains 22 mm, its diameter 6 mm.

Distribution
This extinct marine species was found in New Zealand

References

 Maxwell, P.A. (2009). Cenozoic Mollusca. pp 232–254 in Gordon, D.P. (ed.) New Zealand inventory of biodiversity. Volume one. Kingdom Animalia: Radiata, Lophotrochozoa, Deuterostomia. Canterbury University Press, Christchurch

External links
 C. R. Laws The Molluscan Faunule at Pakaurangi Point, Kaipara—No. 1, Auckland., Transactions and Proceedings of the Royal Society of New Zealand Volume 68, 1938-39
  C.R. Laws, Tertiary Mollusca from Hokianga District, North Auckland.; Transactions and Proceedings of the Royal Society of New Zealand vol. 76, 1946-1947

komiticus
Gastropods described in 1939